Oscar Quagliatta (born October 30, 1964 in Montevideo, Uruguay) is a former Uruguayan footballer who played for clubs of Uruguay, Chile and Colombia.

Teams
  Huracán Buceo 1988–1989
  Liverpool 1990–1991
  Huachipato 1992–1993
  Liverpool 1994
  Deportivo Cali 1995–1997
  Central Español 1998–1999
  Fénix 2000
  Rentistas 2001–2003

External links
 
 

1964 births
Living people
Uruguayan footballers
Uruguayan expatriate footballers
Huracán Buceo players
Central Español players
Centro Atlético Fénix players
Liverpool F.C. (Montevideo) players
C.A. Rentistas players
C.D. Huachipato footballers
Deportivo Cali footballers
Uruguayan Primera División players
Categoría Primera A players
Primera B de Chile players
Chilean Primera División players
Expatriate footballers in Chile
Expatriate footballers in Colombia
Association football forwards